The National Historic Trails Interpretive Center (NHTIC) is an  interpretive center about several of the National Historic Trails and is located northwest of Casper, Wyoming on Interstate 25. It is operated through a partnership between the Bureau of Land Management, the City of Casper, and the National Historic Trails Center Foundation. The center offers interpretive programs, exhibits, multi-media presentations, and special events.

History
The idea for an interpretive center in Casper began with the creation of a small trails committee; eventually this committee became the non-profit, National Historic Trails Center Foundation (NHTCF). In 1992 the Bureau of Land Management (BLM) joined with the NHTCF to work on the project, committing to pay half of the $10 million estimated cost. The city of Casper donated 10 acres of land for the center's site.

In 1994, voters in Casper passed the Optional One Cent Tax, which helped fund construction of the center's exhibits. The Wyoming State Legislature also passed a bill to help fund the center that same year. By 1997 plans for the center were complete, and a bill to support construction and operating costs was signed into law by President Bill Clinton.

The groundbreaking for construction took place on June 21, 1999, and the center officially opened August 9, 2002.

Exhibits
The center contains several permanent exhibits and hosts temporary, traveling, exhibits as well.

Permanent exhibits are on the four trails that run together through Wyoming:
The Oregon Trail
The Mormon Pioneer Trail
The California Trail
The Pony Express Trail

Entrance to the center is free.

See also
 Mormon Trail Center at Winter Quarters
 National Historic Trail
 National Historic Oregon Trail Interpretive Center
 Oregon-California Trails Association
 List of Registered Historic Places in Wyoming

References

External links
National Historic Trails Interpretive Center - official site

Oregon Trail
Mormon Trail
California Trail
National Historic Trails of the United States
Buildings and structures in Casper, Wyoming
Museums in Natrona County, Wyoming
American West museums in Wyoming
Tourist attractions in Casper, Wyoming